The following list is a complete collection of results for the Ireland national rugby league team.

1990s

2000s

2010s

2020s

See also

Rugby league in Ireland
List of Ireland national rugby league team players
Ireland national rugby league team
Ireland A national rugby league team
Ireland women's national rugby league team

References

External links
 Ireland – Rugby League Project
 History Of Rugby League In Ireland

Rugby league in Ireland
Ireland national rugby league team
Irish rugby league lists